Chionanthus cordulatus grows as a shrub or small tree up to  tall, with a trunk diameter of up to . Bark is greenish. The flowers are white or yellowish green. Habitat is lowland forest from sea-level to  altitude. C. cordulatus is found in Malaysia (Sabah) and Indonesia (Sulawesi).

References

cordulatus
Plants described in 1898
Flora of Sabah
Flora of Sulawesi